Grevillea bedggoodiana, commonly known as Enfield grevillea, is a species of flowering plant in the family Proteaceae and is endemic to a restricted area near Ballarat in Victoria, Australia. It is a prostrate to low-lying shrub with coarsely serrated, egg-shaped to oblong leaves and green and pink flowers.

Description

Taxonomy
Grevillea bedggoodiana was first formally described in 1986 by Donald McGillivray from an unpublished description by Jim Willis, in McGillivray's book New Names in Grevillea (Proteaceae).
The specific epithet commemorates Stella Bedggood (1916-1978) a member of the Ballarat Field Naturalists' Club.

Distribution and habitat
Enfield grevillea occurs in eucalypt woodland between Enfield and Smythesdale near Ballarat in Victoria.

Conservation status
The species is listed as "vulnerable" under the Australian Government Environment Protection and Biodiversity Conservation Act, and as "vulnerable" in Victoria under the Flora and Fauna Guarantee Act 1988 and the Department of Environment and Primary Industries Advisory List of Rare Or Threatened Plants In Victoria.

References

bedggoodiana
Flora of Victoria (Australia)
Proteales of Australia
Plants described in 1986